The 1937–38 Carnegie Tech Tartans men's ice hockey season was the 7th season of play for the program.

Season
When the Penn-Ohio Intercollegiate Hockey League was being formed, Carnegie Tech was more than happy to join the new league. The biggest trouble with the team previously had been finding local opponents and this league would help solve that problem. Once the Duquesne Gardens was secured as a venue, they were joined by two other Pittsburgh-area teams and formed the league with four Cleveland counterparts. In the first season they played all 6 conference opponents twice and came out on the wrong side of the ledger more often than not. While most of their games were close, the Tartans won only three games and finished last in the east division.

Roster

Standings

Schedule and Results

|-
!colspan=12 style=";" | Regular Season

References

Carnegie Tech Tartans men's ice hockey seasons
Carnegie Tech
Carnegie Tech
Carnegie Tech
Carnegie Tech